The Triple-A  National Championship Game is a single interleague postseason baseball game between the league champions of the two affiliated Triple-A leagues of Minor League Baseball (MiLB)—the International League (IL) and Pacific Coast League (PCL)—to determine an overall champion of the classification. With the exceptions of 2020 and 2021, the game has been held at the end of each season since 2006.

The event was originally known as the Bricktown Showdown from 2006 to 2008, when it was held annually at AT&T Bricktown Ballpark in Oklahoma City, Oklahoma. It was renamed in 2009, but continued to be held in Oklahoma City. Since 2011, it has been held in a different Triple-A city each year. The 2020 game was cancelled along with the entire minor league season due to the COVID-19 pandemic, which contributed to the lack of a 2021 championship game. In 2022, the game was the culmination of a three-day event called the Triple-A Triple Championship Weekend, in which league champions of the IL and PCL were determined on the first two days and the Triple-A National Champion was decided on the third.

The Sacramento River Cats and Durham Bulls have won three championships. The Columbus Clippers and Omaha Storm Chasers have each won two championships. Five other teams have won one championship each. Nine titles have been won by PCL teams, while the IL has won six titles.

History

Previous postseason series

Periodically from 1904 to 1975, the champions from the top-classification leagues of Minor League Baseball met in the postseason to determine a champion amongst them. The Little World Series (1904–1931) and Junior World Series (1932–1975) usually consisted of a best-of-seven (or eight) series modeled on the World Series of Major League Baseball. Most often, it was held between the champions of the International League (IL) and the American Association (AA). A one-time Triple-A World Series was held in 1983 as a round-robin tournament featuring the champions of the AA, IL, and Pacific Coast League (PCL). The AA and IL champions met in the Triple-A Classic, a best-of-seven series played from 1988 to 1991 in conjunction with the Triple-A Alliance. From 1998 to 2000, the Triple-A World Series was revived as a best-of-five championship series between the IL and PCL champions. The Triple-A World Series was discontinued because of poor attendance.

Bricktown Showdown (2006–2008)

In 2006, Triple-A Baseball announced the creation of a single championship game between the league champions of the International League and Pacific Coast League to determine an overall champion of the classification. The game, called the Bricktown Showdown, was to be played at AT&T Bricktown Ballpark in Oklahoma City, Oklahoma, home of the PCL's Oklahoma RedHawks, following each league's postseason playoffs to determine their league champions. In addition to serving as the pinnacle of the Triple-A and MiLB season, the leagues sought for the championship game to develop and prosper like the Triple-A All-Star Game did since its creation in 1988.

The first Bricktown Showdown was played on September 19, 2006, between the IL-champion Toledo Mud Hens and the PCL-champion Tucson Sidewinders. In front of an announced paid attendance of 12,572 people and a national television audience watching on ESPN2, Tucson defeated Toledo, 5–2. Tucson left fielder Scott Hairston won the game's first Most Valuable Player Award after going 2-for-4 at the plate with 1 run batted in. The game was approved only as a one-time meeting by Major League Baseball, but subsequent meetings were planned for 2007 and 2008 following the success of the initial event. The next two editions, however, experienced successively lower attendances (11,124 in 2007 and 8,213 in 2008).

Triple-A National Championship Game (2009–present)
The Bricktown Showdown was rebranded as the Triple-A Baseball National Championship Game in 2009, and later to simply the Triple-A National Championship Game, to increase the event's national appeal and to emphasize its significance as a championship game. It continued to be held in Oklahoma City, but as attendance continued to diminish (6,777 in 2009 and 7,525 in 2010), the 2010 Triple-A championship would be the last to be decided at Bricktown Park. 

Since 2011, the game has been held in a different Triple-A city each year. The first city to host under this new format was Albuquerque, New Mexico, home of the PCL's Albuquerque Isotopes, who played at Isotopes Park. The 2012 edition was held at Durham Bulls Athletic Park in Durham, North Carolina, home to the IL's Durham Bulls. It continued to alternate host sites thereafter, similar to the Triple-A All-Star Game, but with two consecutive years of PCL hosts followed by two years of IL hosts. No host city has ever had its team qualify for the championship game.

The start of the 2020 season was postponed due to the COVID-19 pandemic before ultimately being cancelled on June 30. This resulted in the cancellation of the 2020 game, which had been slated for Las Vegas Ballpark in Summerlin, Nevada, home of the PCL's Las Vegas Aviators. In conjunction with Major League Baseball's restructuring of Minor League Baseball in 2021, the IL and PCL disbanded, and Triple-A teams were reorganized into the Triple-A East and Triple-A West. Opening Day for the 2021 season was postponed for nearly a month to temporarily eliminate commercial air travel and give players the opportunity to be vaccinated against COVID-19 before the season started. The schedule did not include a postseason for league championship playoffs or the Triple-A National Championship Game. Instead, 10 games that had been postponed from the start of the season were reinserted into the schedule as a postseason tournament called the Triple-A Final Stretch, in which all 30 Triple-A clubs competed for the highest winning percentage.

In 2022, the Triple-A East and West were renamed the International League and Pacific Coast League, respectively, and they carried on the history of those leagues prior to reorganization. The 2022 game was the culmination of a three-day event called the Triple-A Triple Championship Weekend, in which league champions of the IL and PCL were determined on the first two days, and the Triple-A National Champion was crowned on the last. On September 30, the two division winners from the PCL competed for their league championship. The two IL division winners did the same on October 1. The league champions determined on those days competed for the Triple-A National Championship on October 2. The event was held at Summerlin's Las Vegas Ballpark. Plans for a 2023 game have not been announced.

Structure 
The game itself consists of a single nine-inning game to determine a champion. The only championship game to go beyond the prescribed nine innings has been the 2009 contest, which went to eleven innings. From 2006 to 2016, the league that won the Triple-A All-Star Game earned the distinction of having its team designated as the home team. This changed in 2017, when home team status began being awarded to the team from the hosting league. Designated hitters bat in place of pitchers.

The game is staffed by a four-umpire crew, with one umpire behind home plate and the others covering each base. Two of the umpires work in the IL, while two work in the PCL. Positions rotate each year, such that IL umpires are assigned to home plate and second base in odd years, and PCL umpires cover those positions in even years.

Results

Most Valuable Player Award

One player from the winning team is recognized for their outstanding play in the game and is given the Most Valuable Player (MVP) Award.

Appearances by team

Active Triple-A teams appear in bold.

Broadcasts

The event has been televised nationally every year. It aired on ESPN2 from 2006 to 2009 and on NBC Sports Network (formerly known as Versus) from 2010 to 2018. The game aired on Fox Sports in 2019. The 2022 game was televised on MLB Network.

See also

 Triple-A baseball awards

References

External links
 (Archived)

Baseball competitions in the United States
International League
Minor league baseball playoffs and champions 
Pacific Coast League
Recurring sporting events established in 2006
Baseball games